Martin Puhvel (9 December 1933 – 7 December 2016) was a literature researcher of Estonian origin.

Born in Tallinn, he moved to Finland with his parents in 1944, thereafter to Sweden the same year and to Canada in 1949.

He studied at McGill University (Montreal) from 1949–1954, and Harvard University (Boston) from 1954–1958.

Puhvel was a lecturer at the McGill University for old and medieval English literature from 1957 to 1996. He had been a professor since 1980 and professor emeritus since 1998.

Jaan Puhvel is his brother.

Academic Works
Puhvel published 52 works, including the books "'Beowulf' and Celtic Tradition," "The Crossroads in Folklore and Myth," "Cause and Effect in 'Beowulf,'" and "'Beowulf': A Verse Translation and Introduction." He lectured in Canada, the United States, Britain and Italy. He was a member of a number of academic organizations.

References

External links
 
 

1933 births
2016 deaths
Estonian philologists
Canadian philologists
McGill University alumni
Harvard University alumni
Estonian emigrants to Canada
Canadian people of Estonian descent
Estonian World War II refugees
People from Tallinn
Recipients of the Order of the White Star, 4th Class